Love Again (stylized as LOVE again) is the fourteenth full-length studio album released by Japanese singer Ayumi Hamasaki. Stylistically, the album is a return to the aesthetic of Hamasaki's twelfth album, Love Songs. It was released in Japan on February 8, 2013, in six physical versions: CD Only, CD+DVD, CD+Blu-ray, Playbutton, CD+DVD+Goods, and CD+Blu-ray+Goods.

Love again debuted atop the Oricon charts with first week sales of 56,348 copies, eventually reaching total sales of 88,825 copies by the end of its chart run. The album was certified gold by the Recording Industry Association of Japan for shipments of over 100,000 copies, becoming Hamasaki's last album to do so.

15th anniversary
Love Again is the fourth of five releases released to celebrate the fifteenth year of Hamasaki's signing to her record label, Avex. Instead of singles, Hamasaki released two mini-albums Love and Again (the first and second installments of her fifteenth anniversary releases). All original tracks from Love and Again are included on the album, as well as "You & Me", a new track from A Summer Best. The album sold 56,348 copies by the end of the first week in Japan.

Track listing

Charts and certifications

Year-end charts

Certifications

References

2013 albums
Ayumi Hamasaki albums
Dance-pop albums by Japanese artists
Pop rock albums by Japanese artists
Japanese-language albums